The Ivory Child is a novel by H. Rider Haggard featuring Allan Quatermain.

Plot
While Quatermain visits Lord Randall, two foreigners come asking for Macumazana—that is, asking for Allan Quatermain by the name he used among the Africans. The two visitors are Harut and Marut, priests and doctors of the White Kendah People and they have come to ask Allan Quatermain for his help. The White Kendah people are at war with the Black Kendah people who have an evil spirit for a god. And that spirit of the god resides in the largest elephant they have ever seen, an elephant that no man can kill—save Allan Quatermain. And now our intrepid hero must return to Africa and destroy this evil spirit before it kills every one of the White Kendah People.

Themes
The novel is the first in which Haggard deals with the theme of a person who loses his memory after a shocking event and then recovers it after a similar event.

References

External links
 
 

Novels by H. Rider Haggard
1916 British novels
1916 fantasy novels
Fiction set in 1874